NexG PrePaid is a pre-paid credit card issued by AmBank, Malaysia. The card is available in AmBank branches and most 7-Eleven stores in the country. It was the first attempt to bring pre-paid credit cards into the Malaysian market and as of 2007, more than 100,000 NexG cards are in circulation.

See also
 VISA
 American Express
 Diners Club
 Discover
 Maestro
 Octopus card

References

External links
 MasterCard Official website
 MasterCard Corporate website
 MasterCard Merchant website
 MasterCard Business website
 MasterCard PayPass website
 AmBank Official website
 NexG Promotional Site

Credit cards